Davisboro is a city in Washington County, Georgia, United States. Per the 2020 census, the population was 1,832.

History
A post office called Davisboro(ugh) has been in operation since 1821. The community most likely was named after a pioneer settler with the surname Davis. The Georgia General Assembly incorporated the place in 1894 as the "Town of Davisboro".

On May 18, 1922, Charles Atkins, a 15-year-old African-American boy, was tortured and burnt alive by a white mob some 2,000 people strong after killing a white woman.

Geography

Davisboro is located at  (32.980128, -82.608892).

Demographics

2020 census

Note: the US Census treats Hispanic/Latino as an ethnic category. This table excludes Latinos from the racial categories and assigns them to a separate category. Hispanics/Latinos can be of any race.

2000 Census
As of the census of 2000, there were 1,544 people, 140 households, and 102 families residing in the city.  The population density was 505.0 people per square mile (194.8 per km2).  There were 158 housing units at an average density of 51.7 per square mile (19.9 per km2).  The racial makeup of the city was 61.33% African American, 36.79% White, 0.45% Native American, 0.19% Asian, 0.06% from other races, and 1.17% from two or more races. Hispanic or Latino of any race were 1.10% of the population.

There were 140 households, out of which 39.3% had children under the age of 18 living with them, 42.1% were married couples living together, 25.7% had a female householder with no husband present, and 27.1% were non-families. 25.0% of all households were made up of individuals, and 13.6% had someone living alone who was 65 years of age or older.  The average household size was 2.99 and the average family size was 3.65.

In the city, the population was spread out, with 9.3% under the age of 18, 15.0% from 18 to 24, 57.8% from 25 to 44, 14.9% from 45 to 64, and 3.0% who were 65 years of age or older.  The median age was 35 years. For every 100 females, there were 26.6 males.  For every 100 females age 18 and over, there were 23.5 males.

The median income for a household in the city was $25,536, and the median income for a family was $30,625. Males had a median income of $37,750 versus $18,750 for females. The per capita income for the city was $7,090.  About 32.4% of families and 47.9% of the population were below the poverty line, including 55.6% of those under age 18 and 22.4% of those age 65 or over.

See also

 Central Savannah River Area

References

 

Cities in Georgia (U.S. state)
Cities in Washington County, Georgia